There have been a total of 3 Formula One drivers from Colombia.

Former drivers

Ricardo Londoño is listed as the first Colombian racer in Formula One. He was entered by Ensign for the 1981 Brazilian Grand Prix, however was denied the license that would have enabled him to compete.

A year later, Roberto Guerrero was snapped up by Ensign. He only finished two races out of the 15 he entered that season. For 1983 the team was merged with Theodore Racing, however this did not bring a change in fortunes and he was forced out of the sport when Theodore ran out of money before the final race of the season.

Juan Pablo Montoya is the most successful Colombian driver to race in F1. In a career spanning five and a half seasons he won 7 Grands Prix for Williams and McLaren, including the 2003 Monaco Grand Prix, finished on the podium 30 times and finished 3rd in the championship twice, in 2002 and 2003. Having won the Indianapolis 500 twice, he is one of two active drivers one race win away from completing the Triple Crown of Motorsport.

Timeline

See also
List of Formula One Grand Prix winners

References